The 2012–13 Utah State Aggies men's basketball team represented Utah State University in the 2012–13 college basketball season. This was head coach Stew Morrill's fifteenth season at Utah State. The Aggies played their home games at the Smith Spectrum and were in their final year as members of the Western Athletic Conference. In July 2013, the Aggies will become full members of the Mountain West Conference. They finished the season 21–10, 11–7 in WAC play to finish in a tie for fourth place. They lost in the quarterfinals of the WAC tournament to Texas–Arlington. With over 20 wins, they Aggies would have been considered to participate in the CBI or CIT. However, citing injuries, the Aggies chose not to play in a postseason tournament ending a streak of 13 straight postseason appearances.

Roster

Schedule
 

|-
!colspan=9| Exhibition

|-
!colspan=9| Regular season

|-
!colspan=9| WAC tournament

References 

Utah State Aggies
Utah State Aggies men's basketball seasons
Aggies
Aggies